Dunnigan (formerly, Antelope) is a census-designated place in Yolo County, California on Interstate 5. The population was 1,416 at the 2010 census. Dunnigan's ZIP code is 95937 and its area code 530. It lies at an elevation of 69 feet (21 m).

History
The town of Dunnigan was founded as Antelope by two early settlers, J. S. Copp and Jolin Wilson. During the year 1853 they were living down nearer the Sacramento River, but the winter flood washed them on to higher ground and they settled on new claims here. Next year, A. W. Dunnigan, a Yolo County postal worker, came and gave name to the place. With him were Henry Yarick and Abial Barker, the former going into the hotel business with Dunnigan, the inn being known as "Dunnigan's." Other neighbors were Irving W. and William Brownell, Isaac Rice, D. T. Bird, Harry Porterfield and M. A. Rahm. The first store was opened in 1866 by G. B. Lewis, who sold out to William Earll. Z. J. Brown was the proprietor of a drug and notion store for several years, after which he was succeeded by G. W. Gray. In 1876 the railroad came along, and the town plat of Dunnigan was filed for record at the county seat November 1 of that year.

A post office opened in 1856, the name was changed from Antelope to Dunnigan in 1876.

Geography
Dunnigan is located 11 miles (18 km) from Arbuckle and nearly 40 miles (64 km) from Vacaville and Sacramento.

According to the United States Census Bureau, the community is approximately 5.2 sq mi (13.2 km); all land.

Climate
According to the Köppen Climate Classification system, Dunnigan has a hot-summer Mediterranean climate, abbreviated "Csa" on climate maps.

Demographics

2010
The 2010 United States Census reported that Dunnigan had a population of 1,416. The racial makeup of Dunnigan was 836 (59.0%) White, 107 (7.6%) African American, 25 (1.8%) Native American, 19 (1.3%) Asian, 1 (0.1%) Pacific Islander, 339 (23.9%) from other races, and 89 (6.3%) from two or more races. Hispanic or Latino of any race were 583 persons (41.2%).

The Census reported that 1,416 people (100% of the population) lived in households, 0 (0%) lived in non-institutionalized group quarters, and 0 (0%) were institutionalized.

There were 504 households, out of which 165 (32.7%) had children under the age of 18 living in them, 284 (56.3%) were opposite-sex married couples living together, 53 (10.5%) had a female householder with no husband present, 28 (5.6%) had a male householder with no wife present.  There were 28 (5.6%) unmarried opposite-sex partnerships, and 2 (0.4%) same-sex married couples or partnerships. 115 households (22.8%) were made up of individuals, and 52 (10.3%) had someone living alone who was 65 years of age or older. The average household size was 2.81.  There were 365 families (72.4% of all households); the average family size was 3.33.

The population was spread out, with 362 people (25.6%) under the age of 18, 103 people (7.3%) aged 18 to 24, 298 people (21.0%) aged 25 to 44, 372 people (26.3%) aged 45 to 64, and 281 people (19.8%) who were 65 years of age or older.  The median age was 41.7 years. For every 100 females, there were 91.1 males.  For every 100 females age 18 and over, there were 93.8 males.

The homeowner vacancy rate was 1.9%; the rental vacancy rate was 16.7%.  1,076 people (76.0% of the population) lived in owner-occupied housing units and 340 people (24.0%) lived in rental housing units.

2000
As of the census of 2000, there were 897 people, 189 households, and 169 families residing in the area. The population density was 18/sq mi (7/km). There were 205 housing units at an average density of 4.1 per square mile (1.6/km). The racial makeup of the community was 42.6% White, 0.9% African American, 1.9% Native American, 0.7% Asian, 0.2% Pacific Islander, 50.5% from other races, and 3.2% from two or more races. Hispanic or Latino of any race were 79.2% of the population.

There were 189 households, out of which 65.6% had children under the age of 18 living with them, 73.5% were married couples living together, 10.1% had a female householder with no husband present, and 11.0% were non-families. Individual households account for 9.5% of the total. The population included 5.1% of people over 65 years of age. The average household size was 4.02 and the average family size was 4.24.

Minors numbered 35.1%; 12.5% from 18 to 24, 29.7% from 25 to 44, 17.6% from 45 to 64, and 5.1% who were 65 years of age or older. The median age was 27 years. For every 100 females, there were 127.3 males. For every 100 females age 18 and over, there were 135.6 males.

The median income for a household in the area was $28,833, and the median income for a family was $24,250. The per capita income for the community was $7,879. About 32.5% of families and 56.2% of the population were below the poverty line, including 65.8% of those under age 18 and 18.2% of those age 65 or over.

Since the housing boom of the early 2000s, several high scale homes have been built in the Dunnigan area.  The area east of Interstate 5 has seen the majority of the recent housing boom.  Of particular interest to buyers and current residents is the large lots that are available for reasonable prices compared to the adjacent Sacramento market.

References

External links

Census-designated places in Yolo County, California
Populated places established in 1853
Census-designated places in California